The 2011–12 Copa Argentina was the third edition of the Copa Argentina, and the first since 1970. The competition began on August 31, 2011 and ended on August 8, 2012. The tournament featured 186 clubs from the top five levels of the Argentine football league system. The winner (Boca Juniors) qualified for the 2012 Copa Sudamericana.

The tournament was originally scheduled to end on May 25, but due to the participation of Boca Juniors in the knockout stages of the Copa Libertadores. The final was disputed on 8 August 2012, with the triumph for Boca Juniors 2–1 against Racing.

Teams 
One hundred and eighty-six teams took part in this season's competition. All the teams from the Primera División (20), Primera B Nacional (20), Primera B Metropolitana (21), Torneo Argentino A (25), Primera C (20), Torneo Argentino B (60), and Primera D (18) competed in the tournament. Two teams from provinces that do not have representation and that compete in the Torneo del Interior rounded out the field of participants.

Primera División

 All Boys
 Argentinos Juniors
 Arsenal
 Atlético de Rafaela
 Banfield
 Belgrano
 Boca Juniors
 Colón
 Estudiantes (LP)
 Godoy Cruz
 Independiente
 Lanús
 Newell's Old Boys
 Olimpo
 Racing
 San Lorenzo
 San Martín (SJ)
 Tigre
 Unión
 Vélez Sársfield

Primera B Nacional

 Aldosivi
 Almirante Brown
 Atlanta
 Atlético Tucumán
 Boca Unidos
 Chacarita Juniors
 Defensa y Justicia
 Deportivo Merlo
 Desamparados
 Ferro Carril Oeste
 Gimnasia y Esgrima (J)
 Gimnasia y Esgrima (LP)
 Guillermo Brown (M)
 Huracán
 Independiente Rivadavia
 Instituto
 Patronato
 Quilmes
 River Plate
 Rosario Central

Primera B Metropolitana

 Acassuso
 Almagro
 Barracas Central
 Brown (A)
 Colegiales
 Comunicaciones
 Defensores de Belgrano
 Deportivo Armenio
 Deportivo Morón
 Estudiantes (BA)
 Flandria
 General Lamadrid
 Los Andes
 Nueva Chicago
 Platense
 San Telmo
 Sarmiento (J)
 Sportivo Italiano
 Temperley
 Tristán Suárez
Villa San Carlos

Torneo Argentino A

 Alumni (VM)
 Central Córdoba (SdE)
 Central Norte
 CAI
 Cipolletti
 Crucero del Norte
 Defensores de Belgrano (VR)
 Deportivo Maipú
 Douglas Haig
 Gimnasia y Esgrima (CdU)
 Gimnasia y Tiro
 Huracán (TA)
 Juventud Antoniana
 Juventud Unida Universitario
 Libertad (S)
 Racing (C)
 Racing (O)
 Rivadavia
 San Martín (T)
 Santamarina
 Sportivo Belgrano
 Talleres (C)
 Tiro Federal
 Unión (MdP)
 Unión (S)

Primera C

 Argentino (M)
 Berazategui
 Central Córdoba (R)
 Defensores de Cambaceres
 Defensores Unidos
 Deportivo Español
 Deportivo Laferrere
 Dock Sud
 El Porvenir
 Excursionistas
 Ferrocarril Midland
 J. J. de Urquiza
 Leandro N. Alem
 Liniers
 Luján
 Sacachispas
 San Miguel
 Talleres (RE)
 UAI Urquiza
 Villa Dálmine

Torneo Argentino B

 9 de Julio (M)
 9 de Julio (R)
 Altos Hornos Zapla
 Alvarado
 Alvear
 Atenas (RC)
 Bella Vista (BB)
 Ben Hur
 Boca (RG)
 Chaco For Ever
 Colegiales (C)
 Concepción BRS
 Concepción
 Cruz del Sur
 Defensores (P)
 Deportivo Madryn
 Deportivo Roca
 El Linqueño
 Estudiantes (RC)
 Ferrocarril Sud
 General Paz Juniors
 Gimnasia y Esgrima (Mza)
 Grupo Universitario (T)
 Guaraní Antonio Franco
 Guaymallén
 Huracán (CR)
 Huracán (LH)
 Independiente (T)
 Jorge Brown (P)
 Jorge Newbery (CR)
 Jorge Newbery (VT)
 Juventud Alianza
 Juventud Unida (G)
 La Emilia
 Las Heras (C)
 Liniers (BB)
 Maronese
 Mitre (SdE)
 Once Tigres
 Origone
 Paraná
 Policial
 Racing (T)
 San Martín (F)
 San Martín (M)
 San Jorge (SF)
 San Jorge (T)
 Sarmiento (C)
 Sarmiento (R)
 Sarmiento (SdE)
 Sportivo Del Bono
 Sportivo Las Parejas
 Sportivo Patria
 Talleres (P)
 Textil Mandiyú
 Tiro Federal (M)
 Trinidad
 Unión (VK)
 Villa Cubas (C)
 Villa Mitre

Primera D

 Argentino (Q)
 Argentino (R)
 Atlas
 Cañuelas
 Central Ballester
 Centro Español
 Claypole
 Deportivo Paraguayo
 Deportivo Riestra
 Fénix
 Ituzaingó
 Juventud Unida
 Lugano
 Muñiz
 San Martín (B)
 Sportivo Barracas
 Victoriano Arenas
 Yupanqui

Torneo del Interior
 Real Madrid (RG)
 Riojano

Venues 
For the final phase, the organization selected 15 stadiums in several Argentine provinces to be used as neutral grounds.

Schedule

Initial phase

First round 
In the First Round, the eighteen teams from the Primera D competed in nine matches. The winners of the nine matches advanced to the next round into the Metropolitan Zone. The matches were played on August 31.

Second round 
The Second Round is divided into two zones: the Metropolitan Zone and the Interior Zone.

Metropolitan Zone 
The Metropolitan Zone featured the twenty-one teams from the Primera B Metropolitana, the twenty teams from Primera C, and the nine winners of the First Round. The twenty-five winners advanced to the Fourth Round.

Interior Zone 
The Interior Zone featured the twenty-five teams from the Torneo Argentino A, the sixty teams from the Torneo Argentino B, and two invited teams. The forty-one winners advanced to the Third Round. The matches were played on September 6–8, 2011.

Third round 
The Third Round featured the forty-one winners of the Second Round's Interior Zone plus five additional team. The twenty-three match winners advanced to the Fourth Round. The matches were played on September 14 and 15.

Fourth round 
The Fourth Round will feature the forty-eight teams that advance from the Second and Third Stages. The teams will be drawn into twenty-four matches. The winners of matches will advance to the Round of 64. The matches will be played from September 21 to 29.

Final phase 
The Final Phase will consist of the Round of 64, Round of 32, Round of 16, quarterfinals, semifinals, and the Final. Beginning in the Round of 64, the sixty-four qualified teams will be split into four groups. Each group will consist of five Primera División teams, five Primera B Nacional teams, and six winners from the Fourth Round. Each group will contest their matches in a specific location chosen by the organizing committee. The draw took place on October 27, 2011.

Brackets

Group 1

Group 2

Group 3

Group 4

Semifinals and Final 

Tied 1–1 after regular time, Boca Juniors advanced 5–4 on penalty shootout.

Tied 0–0 after regular time, Racing Club advanced 5–4 on penalty shootout.

Top goalscorers 

Source:

References

External links 
 Copa Argentina on the Argentine Football Association's website 
 Presentation on the AFA's website 
 Copa Argentina 2011/2012, Soccerway.com

2011–12 in Argentine football
2011
2011–12 domestic association football cups